The Freeman Book Awards are annual awards for new young adult and children's literature, that contribute meaningfully to an understanding of East and Southeast Asia.

Establishment 
In 2016 the National Consortium for Teaching about Asia (NCTA), the Committee on Teaching about Asia (CTA) of the Association for Asian Studies (AAS), and Asia for Educators (AFE) at Columbia University announced the establishment of the annual Freeman Book Awards for new young adult and children’s literature. The awards recognize quality books for children and young adults that contribute meaningfully to an understanding of East and Southeast Asia. Awards are given in two categories: Children’s and Young Adult on the several countries of East and Southeast Asia. The awards were inaugurated in 2016. They are named for the Freeman Foundation.

The Freeman Foundation was established in 1994 through the bequest and in memory of the businessman and benefactor Mansfield Freeman, a co-founder of the international insurance and financial conglomerate American International Group, Inc., better known as AIG. It is dedicated to "augmenting international understanding between the United States and the nations of East Asia.

Winner and honorable mentions, 2021 
Source:

Children’s Literature

 Winner: The Floating Field, by Scott Riley, Illustrated by Nguyen Quang and Kim Lien (Millbrook Press) - no-fiction, set in Thailand
 Honorable Mention: Saving Sorya Chang and the Sun Bear, by Trang Nguyen, Illustrated by Jeet Zdung (Dial Books) - fiction, set in Vietnam
 Honorable Mention: The Star Festival, by Moni Ritchie Hadley, Illustrated by Mizuho Fujisawa (Albert Whitman) - fiction, set in Japan

Young Adult/Middle School Literature

 Winner: Finding Junie Kim, by Ellen Oh (Harper Collins) - fiction, set in Korea and America
 Honorable mention: Temple Alley Summer, By Sachiko Kashiwaba, translated by Avery Fischer Udagawa, Illustrated by Miho Satake (Yonder) - fiction, set in Japan
 Honorable Mention: While I Was Away, by Waka T. Brown (Quill Tree Books) - fiction, set in Japan and America
 Of Note: How Do You Live?, by Genzaburō Yoshino, translated by Bruno Navasky (Algonquin) - fiction, set in Japan
 Of Note: Soul Lanterns, by Shaw Kuzki, translated by Emily Balistrieri (Delacorte Press) - fiction, set in Japan

Young Adult/High School Literature

 Winner: Tsunami Girl, by Julian Sedgwick, illustrated by Chie Kutsuwada (Guppy Books) - fiction, set in Japan and America
 Winner: The Waiting, by Keum Suk Gendry-Kim, illustrated by Chie Kutsuwada (Drawn and Quarterly) - fiction, set in Korea
 Honorable Mention: Colorful, by Eto Mori, translated by Jocelyne Allen (Counterpoint Press) - fiction, set in Japan
 Honorable Mention: Freedom Swimmer, by Wai Chim (Scholastic) - , fiction, set in China
 Honorable Mention: The Minamata Story, by Sean Michael Wilson, illustrated by Akiko Shimojima (Stone Bridge Press) - non-fiction, set in Japan
 Of Note: The Forest of Stolen Girls, by June Hur (Feiwei & Friends) - fiction, set in Korea

Winner and honorable mentions, 2020 
Source:

Children's Literature

 Winner: No Steps Behind: Beate Sirota Gordon’s Battle for Women’s Rights in Japan by Jeff Gottesfeld, illus. Shiella Witanto  (Creston Books) -  Non-fiction, set in Japan
 Honorable Mention: A Bowl of Peace: A True Story by Caren Stelson, illus. Akira Kusaka (Carolrhoda Books) - Non-fiction, set in Japan
 Honorable Mention: Rice by Hongcheng Yu (Reycraft Books) - Non-fiction, set in China
 Honorable Mention: The Ocean Calls: A Haenyeo Mermaid Story, by Tina Cho, illus. by Jess X. Snow (Kokila Press) - Fiction, set in Korea

Young Adult/Middle School Literature

 Winner: Brother’s Keeper, by Julie Lee (Holiday House) - fiction, set in Korea
 Honorable Mention: Beyond Me, by Annie Donwerth-Chikamatsu (Simon & Schuster) - fiction, set in Japan
 Of Note: All Thirteen: The Incredible Cave Rescue of the Thai Boys’ Soccer Team, by Christina Soontornvat (Candlewick Press) - non-fiction, set in Thailand

Young Adult/High School Literature

 Winner: Crossing the Farak River, by Michelle Aung Thin (Annick Press) - fiction, set in Myanmar
 Winner: Year of the Rabbit,  by Tian Veasna, Translated by Helge Dascher (Drawn & Quarterly) - non-fiction, set in Cambodia
 Honorable Mention: The Silence of Bones, by June Hur (Macmillan) - fiction, set in Korea
 Honorable Mention: Tiananmen 1989: Our Shattered Hopes, by Lun Zhang and Adrien Gombeaud, Illustrated by Ameziane (IDW Publishing) - non-fiction, set in China
 Of Note: Almond, by Won-pyung Sohn, translated by Sandy Joosun Lee (Harper Collins) - fiction, set in Korea
 Of Note: Like Spilled Water, by Jennie Liu (Lerner Publishing Group) -fiction, set in China
 Of Note: Banned Book Club, by Kim Hyun Sook, Ryan Estrada, Illustrated by Hyung-Ju Ko (Iron Circus Comics) - non-fiction, set in Korea

Winners and honorable mentions, 2019 
Source:

Children’s Literature

 Winner: The Phone Booth in Mr. Hirota’s Garden by Heather Smith, illus. Rachel Wada (Orca Books) - Fiction, set in Japan
 Honorable Mention: Magic Ramen: The Story of Momofuku Ando by Andrea Wang, illus. Kana Urbanowicz (Little Bee Books) - Non-fiction, set in Japan
 Honorable Mention: The Moose of Ewenki by Gerelchimeg Blackcrane, illus. by Jiu Er (Greystone Books) - Fiction, set in Inner Mongolia, China
 Honorable Mention: When Spring Comes to the DMZ by Uk-Bae Lee (Plough Publishing House) - Fiction, set in Korea

Young Adult/Middle School Literature

 Winner: All The Ways Home by Elsie Chapman (Macmillan, Feiwel and Friends) - Fiction, set in Japan
 Winner: A Place to Belong by Cynthia Kadohata, Illustrated by Julia Kuo (Simon & Schuster, Atheneum/Caitlyn Dlouhy Books) - Fiction, set in Japan
 Honorable Mention: Girl of the Southern Sea by Michelle Kadarusman (Pajama Press) - Fiction, set in Indonesia
 Of Note: House Without Walls by Ching Yeung Russell (Simon & Schuster) - Fiction, set in Vietnam
 Of Note: The Magnolia Sword: A Ballad of Mulan Sherry Thomas (Lee & Low) - Fiction, set in China

Young Adult/High School Literature

 Winner: The Weight of Our Sky by Hanna Alkaf (Simon & Schuster, Salaam Reads) - Fiction, set in Malaysia
 Winner: Patron Saints of Nothing by Randy Ribay (Penguin Young Readers, Kokila) - Fiction, set in the Philippines
 Honorable Mention: Indigo Girl by Suzanne Kamata (Gemma Media) - Fiction, set in America and Japan

Winners and honorable mentions, 2018 
Source:

Children’s Literature

 Winner: Moth and Wasp, Soil and Ocean: Remembering Chinese Scientist Pu Zhelong’s Work for Sustainable Farming by Sigrid Schmalzer, illus. by Melanie Linden Chan (Tilbury House Nature Books) - Non fiction, set in China
 Honorable Mention: The Turtle Ship by Helena Ku Rhee, illus. by Colleen Kong-Savage (Shen’s Books/Lee & Low Books) - Fiction, set in Korea
 Honorable Mention: Confucius: Great Teacher of China by Demi,  (Lee & Low Books) - Non fiction, set in China
 Honorable Mention: Thirty Minutes Over Oregon: A Japanese Pilot’s World War II Story by Marc Tyler Nobleman, illus. by Melissa Iwai  (Clarion Books) - Non fiction, set in the U.S.
 Of Note: My Beijing: Four Stories of Everyday Wonder by Nie Jun, trans. by Edward Gauvin  (Lerner Books) - Fiction, set in China

Young Adult/Middle School Literature

 Winner: Grenade by Alan Gratz (Scholastic Press) - Historical fiction, set in Japan
 Honorable Mention: Onibi: Diary of a Yokai Ghost Hunter by Atelier Sento, Cecile Brun, Olivier Pichard, trans. by Marie Velde (Tuttle Publishing) - Fiction, set in Japan
 Honorable Mention: Shadow of the Fox by Julie Kagawa (Harlequin Teen) - Fiction, set in Japan
 Honorable Mention: Too Young to Escape: A Vietnamese Girl Waits to be Reunited with Her Family by Van Ho and Marsha Skrypuch (Pajama Press) - Non fiction, set in Vietnam

Young Adult/High School Literature

 Winner: Go: A Coming of Age Novel by Kazuki Kaneshiro, Translated by Takami Nieda (AmazonCrossing) - Fiction, set in Japan
 Winner: The Astonishing Color of After by Emily X.R. Pan (Little, Brown Books for Young Readers) - Fiction, set in Taiwan
 Honorable Mention: Girls on the Line by Jennie Lie (Lerner Publishing Group/Carolrhoda Lab) - Fiction, set in China
 Honorable Mention: Thousand Beginnings and Endings edited by Ellen Oh and Elsie Chapman (Harper Collins Publishers) - Fiction, set in East and South Asia
 Of Note: The Analects: An Illustrated Edition by Confucius, Adapted and Illustrated by C.C. Tsai, trans. by Brian Bruya, With a foreword by Michael Puett (Princeton University Press) - Non fiction, set China
 Of Note: The Dragon Ridge Tombs by Tianxia Bachang, trans. by Jeremy Tiang (Penguin Random House) - Fiction, set China

Winners and honorable mentions, 2017
Source:

Children's Literature
 Winner: The Crane Girl by Curtis Manley, illustr. by Lin Wang (Shen’s Books) - Fiction, set in Japan
 Honorable Mention: An’s Seed by Zaozao Wang, illustr. by Li Huang, tr. Helen Wang (Candied Plums; Bilingual edition) - Fiction, set in China
 Honorable Mention: Chibi Samurai Wants a Pet by Sanae Ishida (Little Bigfoot) - Fiction, set in Japan
 Honorable Mention: My First Book of Vietnamese Words by Tran Thi Minh Phuoc (Tuttle Publishing; Bilingual edition) - Fiction, set in Vietnam
Young Adult/Middle School Literature
 Winner: Bronze and Sunflower by Cao Wenxuan, illustr. by Meilo So, tr. Helen Wang (Candlewick Press) - Fiction, set in China
 Honorable Mention: Hotaka: Through My Eyes – Natural Disaster Zones by John Heffernan, edited by Lyn White (Allen & Unwin) - Fiction, set in Japan
 Honorable Mention: Ten: A Soccer Story by Shamini Flint (Clarion Books, an imprint of Houghton Mifflin Harcourt) - Fiction, set in Malaysia
 Honorable Mention: The Emperor’s Riddle by Kat Zhang (Simon & Schuster; Aladdin) - Fiction, set in China
Young Adult/High School Literature
 Winner: The Forbidden Temptation of Baseball by Doris Jones Yang (Spark Press) - Fiction, set in Japan and the U.S. 
 Honorable Mention: Want by Cindy Pon (Simon & Schuster; Simon Pulse) - Fiction, set in Taiwan
 Honorable Mention: Tanabata Wish by Sara Fujimura (Wishes Enterprises, LLC) - Fiction, set in Japan

Winners and honorable mentions, 2016 
Source:

Children's Literature
 Winner: My Night in the Planetarium by Innosanto Nagara (Seven Stories Press) - Non-Fiction, set in Indonesia
 Honorable Mention: Are You an Echo? The Lost Poetry of Misuzu Kaneko by Misuzu Kaneko (Chin Music Press) - Non-Fiction, set in Japan
Young Adult/Middle School Literature
 Winner: Somewhere Among by Annie Donwerth-Chikamatsu (Atheneum Books for Young Readers) - Fiction, set in Japan
 Winner: The Night Parade by Kathryn Tanquary (Sourcebooks Jabberwocky) - Fiction, set in Japan
 Honorable Mention: Falling into the Dragon’s Mouth by Holly Thompson (Henry Holt BYR/Macmillan Children’s Publishing Group) - Fiction, set in Japan
Young Adult/High School Literature
 Winner: Every Falling Star: The True Story of How I Survived and Escaped North Korea by Sungju Lee and Susan Elizabeth McClelland (Amulet, an imprint of ABRAMS) - Non-Fiction, set in North Korea
 Honorable Mention: Sachiko: A Nagasaki Bomb Survivor’s Story by Caren Stelson (Carolrhoda Books, a division of Lerner Publishing Group) - Non-Fiction, set in Japan

References

External links
 The Freeman Foundation official website
 The Freeman Awards on the National Consortium for Teaching About Asia

Children's literary awards